Zuzana Kronerová (born 17 April 1952) is a Slovak film, television and stage actress. She has been featured in more than twenty films to date.

Filmography
 Selected works
 1981: Infidelity in a Slovak Way (originally made-for-TV; as Zlatka)
 Phoenix (as Helga)
 1982: Scrawls (as Teacher)
 1991: When the Stars Were Red (as Beta)
 2001: The Wild Bees (as Lisajová)
 2003: Pupendo
 2005: Something Like Happiness (as Aunt)
 2008: The Country Teacher (as Mother)
 Gypsy Virgin (as Phuri Daj)
 2009: T.M.A. (as Shopping assistant)
 Unknown Hour (as Sister in charge)
 2010: Surviving Life (as Milada)
 Habermann (aka Habermann's Mill; as Eliška)
 2015: Home Care
 2016: Červená kapitán
 2017: Ice Mother
 2020: Shadow Country

Awards

See also
 List of people surnamed Kroner

References

Sources

External links

 
 Zuzana Kronerová at FDb.cz
 
 Zuzana Kronerová at Kinobox.cz
 
 

Zuzana
1952 births
Living people
Slovak stage actresses
Slovak film actresses
Slovak television actresses
20th-century Slovak actresses
21st-century Slovak actresses
Sun in a Net Awards winners
People from Martin, Slovakia
Czech Lion Awards winners